Rajmund Zieliński (9 October 1940 – 15 August 2022) was a Polish cyclist. He competed at the 1964 Summer Olympics and the 1968 Summer Olympics. In 1964, he won the Tour de Pologne.

Zieliński died on 15 August 2022, at the age of 81.

References

External links
 

1940 births
2022 deaths
Polish male cyclists
Polish track cyclists
Olympic cyclists of Poland
Cyclists at the 1964 Summer Olympics
Cyclists at the 1968 Summer Olympics
Sportspeople from Toruń